Dedy Sutanto (born October 19, 1981, in Surabaya) is an Indonesian former footballer.

References

External links
DEDY SUSANTO at Liga Indonesia

1981 births
Living people
Indonesian footballers
Indonesian Premier Division players
Liga 1 (Indonesia) players
PS Barito Putera players
Deltras F.C. players
Semen Padang F.C. players
Association football goalkeepers
Sportspeople from Surabaya